Diogo Lúcio Tavares Pires (born 4 June 1987), known as Diogo Marzagão or just Marzagão, is a Brazilian footballer who plays as a defensive midfielder for Portuguesa.

Club career
Marzagão was born in São Paulo, but began his career with Novo Horizonte in 2006. After playing amateur football, he played for CRAC during two Campeonato Goiano editions, before joining Fluminense de Araguari.

In the following years, Marzagão played mainly in the Goiás state, representing Quirinópolis (three stints), Goianésia, Grêmio Anápolis, Caldas Novas and Novo Horizonte. In 2013, 2014 and 2015, he also featured for URT.

On 2 July 2015, after a short period at Rio Branco-AC, Marzagão signed for Caldense. He moved to Barretos in December, before returning to Goiás with Rio Verde.

In December 2016, Marzagão was included in Votuporanguense's squad for the 2017 season, and was later presented at Anapolina on 1 May of that year. He subsequently moved to ABECAT, but was released on 30 August 2017, after just one match.

In December 2017, Marzagão joined Villa Nova ahead of the 2018 campaign. On 27 March 2018, he was announced as an addition of Novorizontino, and returned to CRAC on 14 August.

On 22 October 2018, Marzagão agreed to a deal with Água Santa, and helped the club in their promotion from Campeonato Paulista Série A2 in 2019 and 2021, the latter as champions. On 9 June 2021, he was loaned to Portuguesa for the year's Série D.

On 23 November 2021, Marzagão signed a permanent deal with Lusa.

Career statistics

Honours

Club
Rio Branco-AC
Campeonato Acreano: 2015

Rio Verde
Campeonato Goiano Segunda Divisão: 2016

CRAC
Campeonato Goiano Segunda Divisão: 2018

Água Santa
Campeonato Paulista Série A2: 2021

Portuguesa
Campeonato Paulista Série A2: 2022

Individual
Campeonato Paulista Série A2 Best XI: 2022

References

1987 births
Living people
Footballers from São Paulo
Brazilian footballers
Association football midfielders
Campeonato Brasileiro Série D players
Clube Recreativo e Atlético Catalano players
Goianésia Esporte Clube players
Grêmio Esportivo Anápolis players
União Recreativa dos Trabalhadores players
Rio Branco Football Club players
Associação Atlética Caldense players
Barretos Esporte Clube players
Esporte Clube Rio Verde players
Clube Atlético Votuporanguense players
Associação Atlética Anapolina players
Villa Nova Atlético Clube players
Grêmio Novorizontino players
Esporte Clube Água Santa players
Associação Portuguesa de Desportos players